The 2014–15 Yemeni League was the 23rd edition of top level football in Yemen.

The season started on August 15, 2014, brought forward by four months and was scheduled to finish in May 2015. The league was postponed after the 17th round with the last action of the season being on 17 January, a 1:0 victory for Al-Ittihad Ibb over Fahman Abyan. It was later cancelled due to the unsafe conditions in the country with the 2014–15 Yemeni coup d'état and subsequent Civil War.

Teams
May 22 San'a, Al-Ahli Taizz, Al Sha'ab Sana'a and Al Rasheed Ta'izz were relegated to the second tier after finishing in the bottom four places of the 2013–14 season. They were replaced by Fahman Abyan, Al-Wahda Aden, Al-Wahda Sana'a and Al-Shula

Stadia and locations

Al Oruba appear to represent the small town of Zabid, but play all games in San'a'.

League table
Table before season interrupted in January 2015 and subsequently abandoned.

References 

Yemeni League seasons
Yem
1
Cancelled association football competitions